is a passenger railway station located in the Kurokawa neighborhood of Asao-ku, Kawasaki, Kanagawa, Japan and operated by the private railway operator Keio Corporation.

Lines

Station layout
The station has two elevated island platforms serving four tracks.

Platforms

History
Wakabadai Station opened as an elevated station on October 18, 1974.

Passenger statistics
In fiscal 2019, the station was used by an average of 26,954 passengers daily.

The passenger figures for previous years are as shown below.

Surrounding area

 Wakabadai Maintenance Depot
 Kurokawa Station (Odakyu Tama Line)
 Haruhino Station (Odakyu Tama Line)
 Tokyo Metropolitan Wakaba Comprehensive High School
 Inagi Wakabadai Elementary School
 Kodarayato Park

See also
 List of railway stations in Japan

References

External links 

  

Stations of Keio Corporation
Keio Sagamihara Line
Railway stations in Japan opened in 1974
Railway stations in Kawasaki, Kanagawa